Universiti Tunku Abdul Rahman (abbreviated as UTAR) is a non-profit private research university in Malaysia. UTAR ranked top 100 in the Times Higher Education Asia University Rankings 2018 and top 600 in the Times Higher Education World University Rankings 2021, placing it 2nd overall in Malaysia only after University of Malaya. UTAR also ranked 13th in the QS Graduate Employability Rankings 2022 for Graduate Employment Rate  (same score as Polytechnic University of Milan), 31st in UI GreenMetric Ranking Top 50 Under 50 2022, and 3rd in Malaysia for Nature Index Institution Research Output.

UTAR is one of the Premier Digital Tech Universities that are recognized by the Malaysia Digital Economy Corporation (MDEC), focusing on providing students with first-class theoretical and practical training to meet the nation's digital economy demands, and the first Malaysian institution to become part of Alibaba Cloud Academic Alliances.

UTAR was established in June 2002 through the UTAR Education Foundation, a non-for-profit organisation, and a total of 411 students are enrolled in June 2002 for its first intake. As of January 2023, the university has grown to an enrolment of more than 21,000 students and over 79,000 alumni. At first, the university offered only eight honours degree programmes but now offers more than 131 programmes including foundation, undergraduate bachelor degrees, postgraduate masters degrees as well as doctorate PhD programmes.

As of 18th January 2023, UTAR has 9 faculties, 3 academic institutes, 3 academic centres, and 35 research centres. In addition, UTAR has formal collaborative agreements with more than 317 universities and 234 industry partners from 31 countries including the United States, United Kingdom, Canada, Australia, Germany, France, Russia, Singapore, Indonesia, China, Hong Kong, Taiwan, South Korea, Spain, and Poland, providing a wide range of study opportunities for inbound and outbound students alike.

The university has two campuses, the award-winning Kampar campus in the state of Perak and one in Sungai Long located within the Klang Valley in the state of Selangor.

History 
In July 2001, the Malaysian Chinese Association (MCA), a prominent organization in the Malaysian Chinese community, received an invitation from the Malaysian Ministry of Education to establish a university. Tun Dr. Ling Liong Sik, the President of the MCA, chaired a committee that drew up a framework for the establishment of the university. Another committee was formed to compile the necessary documents to receive approval from the local authorities. The second committee was led by Tan Sri Datuk Dr. Ng Lay Swee, the Principal of Tunku Abdul Rahman University College, a tertiary education institution also established by the MCA, and it included Dr. Lai Fatt Sian, the Head of the School of Business Studies of the University College, who became the founding Dean of the UTAR Faculty of Accountancy and Management. The university also established the Faculty of Arts and Social Science, led by Dr. Yeoh Suan Pow, and the Faculty of Information Communication and Technology, led by Dr. Tan Chik Heok. Tun Dr. Ling Liong Sik was appointed Council Chairman of UTAR and Tan Sri Datuk Dr. Ng Lay Swee became the first President and CEO.

In June 2002, UTAR opened its doors to the pioneer batch students on its first campus located in Section 13 of Petaling Jaya, on premises previously owned by the publisher of a local daily called The Star.

Through the three newly established faculties, the university offered its first eight honours degree programmes At that time, the Faculty of Accountancy and Management, under founding Dean Dr. Lai Fatt Sian, hosted more than 6,000 students and was described as the largest business faculty in a Malaysian private university. However, due to space constraints and popularity of the courses, the intake was required to be cut off at remarkably high requirements and many were disappointed having their application rejected. This ultimately resulted in market-driven high calibre graduates being strongly demanded by the industry.

An official ceremony was held to launch UTAR on 13 August 2002 at the main hall of the Tunku Abdul Rahman University College. Attending the ceremony was the fourth Prime Minister of Malaysia, Tun Dr. Mahathir bin Mohamad. The prime minister also officiated the university groundbreaking event at its new campus at Kampar, in the state of Perak.

UTAR once maintained campuses in Petaling Jaya and Kuala Lumpur, but in June 2015 these were consolidated with the Sungai Long campus.

Tan Sri Datuk Dr. Ng Lay Swee retired as the President on 31 March 2008. She was succeeded by Datuk Dr. Chuah Hean Teik. Following her retirement, many pioneering staff members who worked with her from the inception of the university left the establishment as well.

Datuk Dr. Chuah Hean Teik retired as the President on 31 August 2019. He was succeeded by Dr. Ewe Hong Tat effective from 1 September 2019.

Campuses 
Universiti Tunku Abdul Rahman Kampar Campus has an area of 1,300 acres (2.03 square miles; 5.26 square kilometres), making it one of the largest private universities in Malaysia.

Kampar Main Campus 

UTAR Kampar main campus is located at Kampar, Perak. The campus received the first intake of students in May 2007.

UTAR faculties located in Kampar campus are:
 Faculty of Business and Finance (FBF)
 Department of Commerce and Accountancy
 Department of Business
 Department of Economics
 Department of Entrepreneurship
 Department of Finance
 Department of Marketing
 Faculty of Information and Communication Technology (FICT)
 Department of Computer and Communication Technology
 UTAR-Huawei Networking Lab
 Department of Computer Science
 Department of Information Systems
 Faculty of Science (FSc)
 Department of Agricultural and Food Science
 Department of Biological Science
 Department of Biomedical Science
 Department of Chemical Science
 Department of Logistics & International Shipping
 Department of Physical and Mathematical Science 
 Faculty of Engineering and Green Technology (FEGT)
 Department of Construction Management
 Department of Electronic Engineering
 Department of Environmental Engineering
 Department of Industrial Engineering
 Department of Petrochemical Engineering
 Faculty of Arts and Social Science (FAS)
 Department of Advertising
 Department of Journalism
 Department of Languages and Linguistics
 Department of Psychology and Counselling
 Department of Public Relations
 Institute of Chinese Studies (ICS)
 Department of Chinese Studies 
 Centre for Foundation Studies (Kampar Campus) (CFS-KPR)

Sungai Long Campus 

UTAR Sungai Long campus is located at Bandar Sungai Long, Kajang, Selangor.

UTAR faculties located in Sungai Long campus are:
 M. Kandiah Faculty of Medicine and Health Sciences (MK FMHS)
 Department of Pre-Clinical Sciences
 Department of Medicine
 Department of Population Medicine
 Department of Surgery
 Department of Chinese Medicine
 Department of Nursing
 Department of Physiotherapy
 Faculty of Accountancy and Management (FAM)
 Department of Accountancy
 Department of Economics
 Department of International Business
 Department of Building and Property Management
 Lee Kong Chian Faculty of Engineering and Science (LKC FES)
 Department of Architecture & Sustainable Design
 Department of Chemical Engineering
 Department of Civil Engineering
 Department of Electrical & Electronics Engineering
 Department of Internet Engineering & Computer Science
 Department of Mathematical & Actuarial Sciences
 Department of Mechanical & Materials Engineering
 Department of Mechatronics & Biomedical Engineering
 Department of Surveying
 Faculty of Creative Industries (FCI)
 Department of Mass Communication
 Department of Multimedia Design and Animation
 Department of General Studies (DGS)
 Department of Modern Languages
 Department of Game Studies
 Department of Media
 Department of Early Childhood Studies
 Centre for Foundation Studies (Sungai Long) (CFS-SL)
 Centre for Extension Education (CEE)

Academics

Admission 
There are three intakes every year on January, May and October for foundation, bachelor honours degree and postgraduate programmes.

For the entry requirements, students with only Sijil Pelajaran Malaysia (SPM) / Sijil Pelajaran Malaysia Vokasional (SPMV) can apply for the one-year UTAR Foundation programmes, such as Foundation in Science and Foundation in Arts. Those who have completed the Foundation programmes will then be eligible to enrol in the bachelor degree programmes. Other than the UTAR Foundation programmes certificate, students with other qualifications such as Sijil Tinggi Persekolahan Malaysia (STPM), Unified Examination Certificate (UEC), A-Levels, South Australian Matriculation (SAM), Canadian Pre-University (CPU) and National Higher Education Entrance Examination (Gaokao) can also apply for the Bachelor's Honours Degree programmes. Besides, students with a diploma or Foundation qualifications from a college, polytechnic or other universities may also apply for admission to UTAR programmes with chances of gaining successful entry with credit transfer.

Nonetheless, all local and foreign students applying for the entry of UTAR programmes are required to be proficient in the English language as almost all the courses are taught in English (except some Chinese studies programmes). Students are usually required to have a credit or relevant score in either SPM English Language, O-level English Language, UEC English Language, MUET, TOEFL, IELTS, CPE, CAE, SAT or ACT.

Students who wish to apply for admissions can do it online through on the official website of UTAR. They can also visit the UTAR Division of Programme Promotion or Division of Admissions and Credit Evaluation, available at both the Sungai Long Campus and Kampar Campus, for more information on the programmes and requirements for admissions.

Teaching and degrees  
The structure of UTAR Foundation and full-time degree programmes consists of three semesters per year. The first two semesters for the full-time degree programmes, which begin in January and May, are considered long semesters, which are around 19 to 20 weeks (14 weeks of teaching, 3 weeks of examinations, 2 to 3 weeks of semester break), the short semester for the full-time degree programmes that begins in October is only around 13 weeks (7 weeks of teaching, 3 weeks of examination, 3 weeks of semester break). For Foundation studies, the first two semesters which also begins in January and May, are considered as long semesters, which are around 17 or 19 weeks (14 weeks of teaching, 1 week of examinations, 2 or 4 weeks of semester break), the short semester that begins in October is around 16 weeks (12 weeks of teaching, 1 week of examinations, 3 weeks of semester break).

The teaching in UTAR is usually carried out through lecture, tutorial and practical classes. Lectures in UTAR are conducted in large class sizes by qualified lecturers (at least Master's degree qualification for bachelor's degree programmes). A typical lecture class in UTAR can accommodate up to 200 or 300 students. Tutorials consist of smaller class sizes (usually fewer than 30 students) where students often ask questions and have discussions with tutors and other students. Practical classes are commonly arranged for science, engineering, and information technology programmes that require hands on learning through laboratory work.

Scholarships and financial support 
UTAR offers scholarships and loans based on the following criteria:
 Must be a Malaysian citizen
 Family and personal income and commitments
 Scholastic ability and academic performance
 Character and involvement in extra-curricular activities
 Has obtained admission to Universiti Tunku Abdul Rahman
 Pursuing full-time foundation or degree programmes
List of UTAR Scholarships available:
 UTAR Top Achiever Scholarships
 UTAR Top Achiever Scholarships (MBBS)
 UTAR Top Achiever Scholarship (Health Sciences)
 UTAR Nursing Scholarship (Degree)
 UTAR-UEC Scholarship
 UTAR Sport Scholarship
 UTAR Talent Scholarship
 UTAR ACCA Scholarship
 Datuk Sim Mow Yu-UTAR Scholarships Fund
 Tan Sri (Dr.) Lim Goh Tong-UTAR Scholarship Fund 
 Mr. Ng Chin Kiat S.M.J. Scholarship
 UTAR-Sin Chew Daily Education Fund
 UTAR-The Star Education Fund  
 UTAR-Nanyang Education Scholarship

UTAR also provides interest free student loans to financially needy students who are pursuing foundation or undergraduate degree programmes.

Accreditation and memberships 
All UTAR academic programmes are approved by the Malaysian Ministry of Higher Education (MOHE) and accredited by the Malaysian Qualifications Agency (MQA) and Public Service Department (JPA).

UTAR has been awarded self-accreditation status by the Malaysian Qualifications Agency of the Ministry of Higher Education, which authorises UTAR to conduct self-assessments to accredit its programmes in accordance with the criteria set by the MQA, although this status excludes certain programmes that require a professional body's recognition. UTAR was awarded Premier Digital Tech University status by Malaysia Digital Economy Corporation (MDEC).

UTAR is a member of the Dell EMC Academic Alliance, SAP University Alliances and Alibaba Cloud Academic Alliances. UTAR also a member of Alliance of International Science Organizations (ANSO), Association of Commonwealth Universities (ACU), Association to Advance Collegiate Schools of Business (AACSB), Talloires Network of Engaged Universities and a university member of The Alliance on Business Education and Scholarship for Tomorrow (ABEST21).

Various departments and programs at UTAR are also recognized by professional associations and institutes across Malaysia, other Southeast Asian countries, Australia, the Commonwealth, and the United States. The UTAR engineering degree programmes are recognized by the Board of Engineers Malaysia. This recognition allows UTAR engineering graduates to practice in 23 countries including the United States, China, United Kingdom, Canada, Japan, Singapore, Korea, Hong Kong, Australia, Ireland, Russia, Taiwan, Turkey and South Africa under the Washington Accord.

List of Programmes Recognized By Professional Body Besides MQA Accreditation

Research centres 
 Belt and Road Strategic Research Centre (BRSRC)
 Centre for Accounting, Banking & Finance (CABF)
 Centre for Agriculture and Food Research (CAFR)
 Centre for Applied Psychology (CAP)
 Centre for Artificial Intelligence and Computing Applications (CAICA)
 Centre for Artistic Research (CFAR)
 Centre for Biomedical and Nutrition Research (CBNR)
 Centre for Business and Management (CBM)
 Centre for Cancer Research (CCR)
 Centre for Chinese Studies (CChS)
 Centre for Communication Systems & Network (CCSN)
 Centre for Cyber Security (CCS)
 Centre for Disaster Risk Reduction (CDRR)
 Centre for Economic Studies (CES)
 Centre for Entrepreneurial Sustainability (CENTS)
 Centre for Environment and Green Technology Research (CEGT)
 Centre for Healthcare Science and Technology (CHST)
 Centre for Immersive Technology + Creativity (CITC)
 Centre for IoT and Big Data (CIoTBD)
 Centre for International Studies (CIS)
 Centre for Learning and Teaching (CLT)
 Centre for Mathematical Sciences (CMS)
 Centre for Media and Communication Research (CMCR)
 Centre for Modern Languages and Literature (CMLL)
 Centre for Photonics and Advanced Materials (CPAMR)
 Centre for Power Systems and Electricity (CPSE)
 Centre for Railway Infrastructure and Engineering (CRIE)
 Centre for Research in Traditional Chinese Medicine (CRTCM)
 Dr. Wu Lien-Teh Centre for Research on Communicable Diseases (Dr. Wu Lien-Teh CRCD)
 Centre for Research on Non-Communicable Diseases (CRNCD)
 Centre for Stem Cell Research (CSCR)
 Centre of Sustainable Architecture (COSA)
 Centre for Sustainable Mobile Technologies (CSMT)
 Centre for VLSI Design (CVLSI)
 Tun Tan Cheng Lock Centre for Social & Policy Studies (TCLC)

Achievements 
UTAR is awarded MBOT Supportive University/College Award by Malaysia Board of Technologists (MBOT), for giving support to MBOT through membership application drive for staff and programme accreditation by MBOT. UTAR is also the Most Attractive Graduate Employers To Work For in 2021 by Graduates' Choice Award (GCA), placed third (Education Category) at Malaysia's 100 Leading Graduate Employers Awards 2020 and granted CIMA Prize-Winner Excellence Award 2020 Regional Bronze (Asia Pacific) by Chartered Institute of Management Accountants (CIMA).

Rankings and reputation 

UTAR has been mainly ranked by two international ranking systems, the QS University Rankings, and the Times Higher Education University Rankings. UTAR is ranked third among the most productive institutions in the world for research discipline of mobile commerce and its application.

UTAR also ranked 3rd in Malaysia for Nature Index Institution Research Output.

Times Higher Education (THE)

Quacquarelli Symonds (QS)

UI GreenMetric
The international UI GreenMetric annually ranks universities on their sustainability performance in infrastructure, energy and climate change, waste, water, transportation, and education. The ranking is organised by the Universitas Indonesia.

Malaysia Quality Agency (MQA)

The MQA is responsible for the Rating for Higher Education Institutions in Malaysia (SETARA) and the Discipline-Based Rating System (D-SETARA).

Student life

UTAR Student Representative Council
The UTAR Student Representative Council (SRC) represents all students within the university. It was founded in July 2012. In addition to the university-level SRC, each campus has a campus-level Council: SRC UTAR Kampar Campus and SRC UTAR Sungai Long Campus.

The Council membership is as follows:

University SRC
Chairperson
Vice Chairperson
Secretary
Treasurer
Campus SRC
Chairperson
Vice Chairperson
Secretary
Treasurer
2 Auditors
Representative from each faculties
5 campus wide representatives

Student-run societies
Both campuses are home to student-run societies organized around shared interests, hobbies, and professional aspirations. As of March 2017, there were 56 registered societies.

Student accommodation
Students studying at the UTAR Kampar Campus usually stay in these locations:
 Westlake
 Eastlake
 Taman Mahsuri Impian (Kampar Residensi)
 Kampar Putra
 Kampus West City Condominium
 East Tin Campus Suite
 MH Unilodge
 The Trails of Kampar (Agacia)
Meadow Park

Students studying at the Sungai Long Campus usually stay in these locations:
 Sungai Long (SL) 1-15
 Flora Green Condominium
 Cypress Condominium
 Acorn & Hazel Condominium
 Forest Green Condominium
 Taman Taming Indah
 Taman Bukit Sungai Long
 Taming Indah
 Bandar Mahkota Cheras (BMC) 1-3 & 5-9

Partner institutions
As of 13rd January 2023, UTAR have 317 university partners and 234 industry partners.

Below are the partial list of UTAR's university partners:

 Australia
Deakin University
Edith Cowan University
Griffith University
University of Southern Queensland
Western Sydney University
 Brunei
Universiti Brunei Darussalam
University of Technology Brunei
 Cambodia
Norton University
 Canada
Carleton University
Institut national de la recherche scientifique
University of Regina
University of Ottawa
 China
Chinese Academy of Sciences
University of Chinese Academy of Sciences
Shanghai Jiao Tong University
Xi’an Jiaotong University
Huaqiao University
Shenzhen University
Xiamen University
Tianjin University
Beijing Jiaotong University
Northwestern Polytechnical University
China University of Political Science and Law
Zhejiang International Studies University
Anhui Normal University
Anhui University of Finance and Economics
Capital Normal University
Chengdu Normal University
Dezhou University
Haikou University of Economics
Fujian Business University
Fujian University of Traditional Chinese Medicine
Guangxi University
Guangxi Medical University
Guangxi Normal University
Guangxi University for Nationalities
Guangxi University of Chinese Medicine
Guangxi University of Finance and Economics
Guangxi University of Foreign Language
Guangzhou University of Chinese Medicine
Guilin University of Technology
Guiyang University
Guizhou University
Guizhou Minzu University
Guizhou University of Finance and Economics
Henan University of Chinese Medicine
Hengyang Normal University
Shanghai Institute of Technology
Shanghai University
Shenyang University of Chemical Technology
South China Agricultural University
Xinjiang Normal University
Yangzhou University
 France
École des Mines de Douai
Sorbonne Paris North University
 Germany
Dortmund University of Applied Sciences and Arts
Regensburg University of Applied Sciences
RheinMain University of Applied Sciences
West Coast University of Applied Sciences
 Greece
University of West Attica
 Hong Kong, China
Hong Kong Polytechnic University
Hong Kong Shue Yan University
 India
Assam Don Bosco University
Avinashilingam Institute for Home Science & Higher Education for Women
Chandigarh University
Chettinad Academy of Research and Education
Easwari Engineering College
Globsyn Business School
Guru Ghasidas Vishwavidyalaya
Guru Nanak Dev Engineering College
National Institute of Ayurveda
O.P. Jindal Global University
Reva University
Saveetha Institute of Medical And Technical Sciences
Shri Venkateshwara University
Sri Sivasubramaniya Nadar College of Engineering
SRM Institute of Science and Technology
SRM TRP Engineering College
Vellore Institute of Technology
 Indonesia
Petra Christian University
Gadjah Mada University
University of Surabaya
Warmadewa University
Atma Jaya Catholic University of Indonesia
Indonesia University of Education
Islamic University of Indonesia
London School of Public Relations
Syiah Kuala University
Universitas 17 Agustus 1945 Semarang
 Ireland
University of Limerick
 Japan
University of Tsukuba
University of Toyama
Nara Institute of Science and Technology
University of Kitakyushu
Kobe University
Soka University
Gifu University
Josai University
Hirosaki University
Hokuriku University
Komatsu University
Niigata University
Okayama University
Kansai University of International Studies
Aichi Gakuin University
Aoyama Gakuin University
Kwansei Gakuin University
Jissen Women's University
Kanagawa Institute of Technology
Kyushu Institute of Technology
Shibaura Institute of Technology
Muroran Institute of Technology
 Kenya
Meru University of Science and Technology
 Malaysia
University of Malaya
Universiti Teknologi Malaysia
Universiti Sains Malaysia
Universiti Teknologi Petronas
Heriot-Watt University Malaysia
Monash University
Multimedia University
Tunku Abdul Rahman University of Management & Technology
Universiti Malaysia Perlis
Universiti Malaysia Terengganu
Universiti Sains Islam Malaysia
Universiti Teknologi MARA
Universiti Tun Hussein Onn Malaysia
University of Nottingham Malaysia Campus
Wawasan Open University
 Mexico
University of Colima
 Myanmar
Defence Services Medical Academy
 New Zealand
Auckland University of Technology
 Pakistan
Hamdard University
Lahore Garrison University
 Philippines
Davao del Norte State College
De La Salle University
Manuel S. Enverga University Foundation
Mariano Marcos State University
University of Batangas
 Poland
Wroclaw University of Economics
 Russia
Far Eastern Federal University
 South Korea
Hanyang University
Dongseo University
Inje University
Mokwon University
Mokpo National University
Mokpo National Maritime University
Korea Maritime and Ocean University
Kookmin University
Gachon University
Hallym University
Jeonbuk National University
Soongsil University
Busan Women's College
 Spain
Universidad Católica San Antonio de Murcia
 Taiwan
Academia Sinica
National Taiwan University
National Tsing Hua University
National Cheng Kung University
National Yang Ming Chiao Tung University
National Taiwan University of Science and Technology
National Taiwan Normal University
National Taiwan Ocean University
National Taipei University of Technology
National Taipei University of Nursing and Health Sciences
National Taipei University of Education
National Kaohsiung University of Science and Technology
National Kaohsiung Normal University
National Yunlin University of Science and Technology
National Pingtung University of Science and Technology
Feng Chia University
Tamkang University
Tunghai University
Tzu Chi University
National Changhua University of Education
 Tajikistan
Technical University of Tajikistan
 Tanzania
The Institute of Finance Management
Mwalimu Nyerere Memorial Academy
 Thailand
Chiang Mai University
Kasetsart University
King Mongkut's University of Technology North Bangkok
King Mongkut's University of Technology Thonburi
Mae Fah Luang University
Naresuan University
Prince of Songkla University
Suranaree University of Technology
 Turkey
Istanbul University-Cerrahpaşa
Ondokuz Mayıs University
 United Kingdom
University of Leeds
University of Strathclyde
University of Reading
Edinburgh Napier University
 United States
University of Delaware
Illinois State University
Western Michigan University
Regents of the University of California
Chatham University
Fordham University
 Vietnam
Academy of Finance
Hoa Sen University
Tra Vinh University
University of Economics Ho Chi Minh City

Notable alumni
 Datin Paduka Chew Mei Fun, Deputy Ministry of Women, Family and Community Development Malaysia (2009 - 2010)
 Julian Tan Kok Ping, Former Member of Parliament for Bandar Kuching
 Liew Yuan Yuan (刘元元), Host
 Chee Jun Cherng (朱俊丞), Actor
 Julia Farhana Marin, Actor
 Karen Kong Cheng Tshe (龚柯允), Singer
 Joanne Lai, Champion of Astro TVB8 Minutes to Fame 2006
 Ooi Wen Lih, Champion of Astro Star Quest (ASQ) 2016

References

External links

 

 
2002 establishments in Malaysia
Educational institutions established in 2002
Universities and colleges in Perak
Universities and colleges in Selangor
Private universities and colleges in Malaysia
Malaysian Chinese Association
Malaysian educational websites
Architecture schools in Malaysia
Art schools in Malaysia
Business schools in Malaysia
Design schools in Malaysia
Education schools in Malaysia
Engineering universities and colleges in Malaysia
Information technology schools in Malaysia
Information technology institutes
Journalism schools in Malaysia
Medical schools in Malaysia
Nursing schools in Malaysia